Landau is a city in Rhineland-Palatinate, Germany.

Landau may also refer to:

Places
 Landau an der Isar, a town in Bavaria, Germany
 Landau, the former name of Shyrokolanivka, which became part of Ukraine after World War II
 Landau (crater), on the far side of the Moon

Vehicles
 Landau (carriage), a type of convertible carriage named after the city of Landau
 Landau (automobile), a type of convertible auto
 Ford Landau, an automobile produced in Brazil from 1971 to 1983
 Ford Landau (Australia), an automobile produced in Australia from 1973 to 1976

People
 Landau (surname)

Other uses
 Big O notation, also called Landau notation or Bachmann-Landau notation, a mathematical notation describing the limiting behaviour of a function
 Landau quantization, the quantization of the cyclotron orbits of charged particles in a uniform magnetic field, named for Lev Landau
 ASV Landau, a German football club based in Landau, Rhineland-Palatinate

See also 
 Landau Institute for Theoretical Physics, near Moscow, Russia, named for Lev Landau
 Landau Commission, set up by the Israeli Government in 1987